Tahtan may refer to:
 Tahtan, Hormozgan
 Tahtan, Sistan and Baluchestan